Makarand R. Paranjape (born 31 August 1960) is an Indian novelist, poet, the Director at Indian Institute of Advanced Study (IIAS), Shimla and, since 1999, a Professor of English in the Centre for English Studies at the Jawaharlal Nehru University in New Delhi.

Early life and education
Makarand R. Paranjape was born in 1960 in Ahmedabad, Gujarat. He was educated at the Bishop Cotton Boys' School in Bangalore followed by a B.A. (Hons.) in English at St. Stephen's College, University of Delhi, in 1980. Thereafter, he joined the University of Illinois at Urbana–Champaign from where he received his M.A. in English Literature and, subsequently, a PhD, in 1985, on the topic Mysticism in Indian English Poetry.

Career
Makarand Paranjape had started his career in 1980 as a teaching assistant at the University of Illinois Urbana-Champaign (UIUC) and returned to India in 1986 to join the University of Hyderabad, first as lecturer and then reader. In 1994, he joined the Department of Humanities and Social Sciences at IIT Delhi as an associate professor, and between 1999–2018, he served as professor of English at Jawaharlal Nehru University, New Delhi.

IIAS 
Paranjape was appointed as Director of IIAS in August 2018. In August 2020, charges of irregularities filed against him by another office-bearer, leading to a spat with the Chairman and the Vice-Chairman at the institution. Paranjape offered a rebuttal to his critics through an interview with The Wire in April 2021. However, it was later reported that he had violated the MoA (memorandum of association) of the institute as its Director and that it was not any clash with other specific individual heads at the institution.

Works and reception 
In his coffee-table book of poems published in January 2022 as Identity's Last Secret, Paranjape discussed how he "came out of a difficult relationship."  In 2013, Makarand R. Paranjape published a novel called Body Offering. The novel is a tale of a middle-aged man's extra-marital affair with a woman 25 years younger   than him. The Sunday Guardian dubbed the book as one "that walked in the long shadow cast" by Russian-American writer Vladimir Nabakov's 1955 novel Lolita.

Personal life 
In 1987, Paranjape married Sarina, a graduate student at UIUC. In 2006, he married Devaki Singh, daughter of Arun Singh. They divorced in 2014.   He is now married to Gayatri Iyer.

Honours 
 ICCR Chair in Indian Studies, National University of Singapore, August 2010 onwards.
 October–December 2014: Inaugural DAAD-Eric Auerbach Visiting Chair in World Literatures at the University of Tübingen, Germany.

Notes

References

External links
 The Official Makarand Paranjape Webpage
 Makarand Paranjape Webpage at JNU

See also

 Indian English Literature
 Indian Writing in English

1960 births
Living people
Indian literary critics
Writers from Ahmedabad
Indian male poets
English-language poets from India
Bishop Cotton Boys' School alumni
St. Stephen's College, Delhi alumni
University of Illinois Urbana-Champaign alumni
University of Illinois Urbana-Champaign faculty
Academic staff of IIT Delhi
Academic staff of Jawaharlal Nehru University
Poets from Gujarat